Matão is a municipality in the state of São Paulo in Brazil. As of 2020, the town had an estimated population of 83,626 and a population density of 146.3 persons per km². The municipality consists of two districts: Matão and São Lourenço do Turvo.

History 

Matão was first populated by coffee growers at the beginning of the 1890s. The settlers constructed a small chapel in 1894, and in 1895 called their settlement Senhor do Bom Jesus das Palmeiras. The settlement was renamed Matão in 1897 and became a  district of Araraquara. It became an independent municipality on August 27, 1898. The region attracted more small-scale farmers in the 1890s, and development was furthered by the construction of a railroad line, the Estrada de Ferro Araraquara, which was built to connect Rio Claro, in São Paulo State, to Cuiabá, the capital city of Mato Grosso. The rail line reached Matão by 1899. The municipality comprised three districts, Matão, Dobrada and São Lourenço do Turvo, until 1964 when Dobrada became a separate municipality.

Events

Corpus Christi (Solemnity of the Body and Blood of Christ) Feast

Matão is one of the Brazilian cities renowned for its Corpus Christi festivities, which have been celebrated since 1948.  On this day streets of the city are decorated with temporary "rugs" made of crushed colored glass, coffee powder, and other materials in preparation for a religious procession.  These rugs feature religious and municipal scenes and colorful floral and geometric designs.

References

External links
  

 
1894 establishments in Brazil